Renato Rezende (born February 28, 1991) is a Brazilian racing cyclist who represents Brazil in BMX. He represented Brazil at the 2012 Summer Olympics in the men's BMX event.

He represented Brazil at the 2020 Summer Olympics.

References

External links
 
 

1991 births
Living people
Cyclists at the 2012 Summer Olympics
Cyclists at the 2016 Summer Olympics
Olympic cyclists of Brazil
Brazilian male cyclists
Brazilian BMX riders
UCI BMX World Champions (elite men)
Cyclists at the 2011 Pan American Games
Cyclists at the 2015 Pan American Games
Cyclists at the 2019 Pan American Games
South American Games gold medalists for Brazil
South American Games silver medalists for Brazil
South American Games medalists in cycling
Competitors at the 2014 South American Games
Pan American Games competitors for Brazil
Cyclists at the 2020 Summer Olympics
20th-century Brazilian people
21st-century Brazilian people
BMX riders